The  is an electric multiple unit (EMU) train type operated in Japan by the private railway operator Hankyu Railway since 1972.

Operation 
The 5300 series consists of eight-car and seven-car sets.

Seven car sets are not allowed on the Sakaisuji Line.

Formations 
, the fleet consists of 96 cars formed as eight-car and seven-car sets as follows, with two car spares. All "Mc" 5300 cars are at the Umeda end while all lead car "M'c" 5400 cars are at the Kyoto-Kawaramachi and Kita-Senri end.

8-car sets 

 The "Mc" and "M" cars are each fitted with two scissors-type pantographs.

7-car sets 

 The "Mc" and the "M" cars are each fitted with two scissors-type pantographs.

2-car spare set

Interior 
Passenger accommodation consists of longitudinal bench seating throughout. Paneling is made of faux wood.

Gallery

References 

Electric multiple units of Japan
5300 series
Train-related introductions in 1972
1500 V DC multiple units of Japan
Alna Koki rolling stock